Guardia Marina Zañartu Airport  is an airport serving the town of Puerto Williams on the north shore of Navarino Island in the Magallanes Region of Chile. The island is at the southern tip of Chile, and is across a narrow strait from Argentina called Beagle Channel. It is the world's southernmost airport with regular scheduled flights.

The airport is maintained by the General Directorate of Civil Aviation of Chile (DGAC Chile). The runway is on a small peninsula running parallel to the island's shore, and approaches to either end are partially over the water. There is mountainous terrain to the north and to the south.

Navigation is supported by a VOR-DME on the field.

Airlines and destinations

See also
Transport in Chile
List of airports in Chile

Accidents
On February 21, 1991, LAN Chile Flight 1069 suffered a runway overrun when landing due to pilot error, leading to the loss of 20 people.

References

External links
Guardia Marina Zañartu Airport at DGAC Flying Information Service Web Page 
Guardiamarina Zañartu Airport at OpenStreetMap

 Web camera

Airports in Magallanes Region
Navarino Island